Gonipterus scutellatus is a species of weevil in the family Curculionidae. It is commonly known as the eucalyptus snout beetle, the eucalyptus weevil or the gum tree weevil. It feeds and breeds on Eucalyptus trees and is endemic to Australia.

Description
This weevil is greyish-brown with a light coloured transverse band. It is about thirteen millimetres long and not readily distinguishable from the closely related weevil, Gonipterus gibberus, which shares the same common names. The larvae are yellowish-green with black markings and have three dark green stripes on the abdomen which distinguish them from larvae of G. gibberus.

Host plants
Eucalyptus trees are the only hosts for the gum tree weevil. The species most susceptible to attack include Eucalyptus camaldulensis, Eucalyptus globulus, Eucalyptus maidenii, Eucalyptus punctata, Eucalyptus robusta, Eucalyptus smithii and Eucalyptus viminalis.

Distribution
The gum tree weevil is endemic to Australia where Eucalyptus trees are native. The weevil has spread to China, Eswatini, Kenya, Lesotho, Madagascar, Malawi, Mauritius, Mozambique, South Africa, St. Helena, Uganda, Zimbabwe etc. Also to Brazil, Chile and Uruguay and the United States, and in Europe to France, Italy, France, Portugal and Spain.

Life history
Over a period of about three months, adult female gum tree weevils lay about two hundred eggs in batches of about ten in grey coloured capsules. These are attached to the upper or lower sides of the leaves and hatch after about a week. The larvae begin to feed on leaves and young shoots. After moulting three times, the larvae crawl or fall to the ground where they pupate a few centimetres beneath the surface. The weevil's life cycle takes seven to eleven weeks from egg laying to maturity, depending on the temperature. In Mauritius there are about four generations annually and the weevils breed throughout the year. In South Africa there are two generations and they overwinter as adults.

Significance
The gum tree weevil is of little economic significance in Australia where it has natural enemies. In other countries where Eucalyptus has been introduced, that is not the case. Adult gum tree weevils feed mostly on leaves and the soft bark of twigs while the larvae feed mostly on leaves. Heavy infestations cause die back of shoots which may result in the development of epicormic shoots. Repeated defoliations may cause the splitting and death of branches or even whole trees. The egg parasite Anaphes nitens, a wasp which is native to Australia, has been introduced to other countries as a biological control agent to control the gum tree weevil. This has been successful in Mauritius where in two years, incidence of the gum tree weevil has been much reduced. More recently, successful control has also been obtained in Italy and France, and in Spain.

References 

Gonipterini
Beetles of Australia
Insect pests of temperate forests
Beetles described in 1833